Levi Lewis (born May 9, 1998) is an American professional Canadian football quarterback for the Saskatchewan Roughriders of the Canadian Football League (CFL). Lewis played college football for the Louisiana Ragin' Cajuns and he is the school's leader in all-time passing touchdowns with 74. Lewis signed with the Seattle Seahawks as an undrafted free agent in 2022 but was released prior to the season.

High school career 
Lewis attended Scotlandville Magnet High School in Baton Rouge, Louisiana. As a senior Lewis threw for 13 touchdowns while rushing for 20. Lewis was ranked as a 3-star recruit and the 60th best player from the state of Louisiana by 247 Sports. Lewis chose to play college football at the University of Louisiana Lafayette.

College career 
Lewis would appear in 4 games in his freshman season. Lewis would record 2 touchdowns passing with one interception with another touchdown on the ground.

In Lewis's sophomore season he would appear in 14 games. He would throw for 7 touchdowns with two interceptions.

Lewis would have a breakout year in his junior season. Appearing in all 14 of Louisiana's games Lewis would tally 26 touchdowns with 4 interceptions. He threw for 3,050 yards on 243 completions and he also rushed for 3 scores. Lewis would lead the Ragin' Cajuns to the LendingTree Bowl where they would win 27–17. Lewis would be named the game's MVP. With Lewis at the helm Louisiana would go 11–3.

In 2020, Lewis would throw for 19 touchdowns with seven interceptions. He would also rush for five touchdowns while throwing for 2,274 yards on 177 completions. In week one Lewis would lead the Ragin' Cajuns to an upset victory over ranked Iowa State to give Louisiana its first win vs a ranked team since beating Texas A&M in 1996. Lewis would win the First Responder Bowl and lead the Cajun's to a final ranking of 16.

Lewis would take advantage of the extra year of eligibility. In Lewis's fifth season he threw for 2,647 yards with 20 touchdowns. This was enough to break Jake Delhomme's previous school record for career touchdown passes. After losing to Texas in the first week of the season Lewis lead the Cajun's to 13 straight victories and a Sun Belt Championship. He capped off his college career with a win in the New Orleans Bowl. After leading Louisiana to a 4th quarter comeback he was named the game's MVP.

Professional career

Seattle Seahawks 
Lewis signed with the Seattle Seahawks as an undrafted free agent on April 30, 2022. He was released on May 20, 2022.

Saskatchewan Roughriders 
Lewis signed with the Saskatchewan Roughriders of the CFL on August 29, 2022.

References

External links 
 Saskatchewan Roughriders bio
 Louisiana Ragin' Cajuns bio

1998 births
Living people
American football quarterbacks
Louisiana Ragin' Cajuns football players
Players of American football from Baton Rouge, Louisiana
Seattle Seahawks players
Canadian football quarterbacks
Saskatchewan Roughriders players